Visual design elements and principles describe fundamental ideas about the practice of visual design.

Elements of the design of the art

Design elements are the basic units of any visual design which form its structure and convey visual messages. Painter and design theorist Maitland E. Graves (1902-1978), who attempted to gestate the fundamental principles of aesthetic order in visual design, in his book, The Art of Color and Design (1941), defined the elements of design as line, direction, shape, size, texture, value, and color, concluding that "these elements are the materials from which all designs are built."

Colour
Colour is the result of light reflecting back from an object to our eyes. The colour that our eyes perceive is determined by the pigment of the object itself. Colour theory and the colour wheel are often referred to when studying colour combinations in visual design. Colour is often deemed to be an important element of design as it is a universal language which presents the countless possibilities of visual communication.

Hue, saturation, and brightness are the three characteristics that describe colour.

Hue can simply be referred to as "colour" as in red, yellow, or green.
Saturation gives a colour brightness or dullness, which impacts the vibrance of the colour.
Values, tints and shades of colours are created by adding black to a colour for a shade and white for a tint. Creating a tint or shade of colour reduces the saturation.

Colour theory in visual design 
Colour theory studies colour mixing and colour combinations. It is one of the first things that marked a progressive design approach. In visual design, designers refer to colour theory as a body of practical guidance to achieving certain visual impacts with specific colour combinations. Theoretical colour knowledge is implemented in designs in order to achieve a successful colour design.

Colour harmony

Colour harmony, often referred to as a "measure of aesthetics", studies which colour combinations are harmonious and pleasing to the eye, and which colour combinations are not. Colour harmony is a main concern for designers given that colours always exist in the presence of other colours in form or space.

When a designer harmonizes colours, the relationships among a set of colours are enhanced to increase the way they complement one another. Colours are harmonized to achieve a balanced, unified, and aesthetically pleasing effect for the viewer.

Colour harmony is achieved in a variety of ways, some of which consist of combining a set of colours that share the same hue, or a set of colours that share the same values for two of the three colour characteristics (hue, saturation, brightness). Colour harmony can also be achieved by simply combining colours that are considered compatible to one another as represented in the colour wheel.

Colour contrasts

Colour contrasts are studied with a pair of colours, as opposed to colour harmony, which studies a set of colours. In colour contrasting, two colours with perceivable differences in aspects such as luminance, or saturation, are placed side by side to create contrast.

Johannes Itten presented seven kinds of colour contrasts: contrast of light and dark, contrast of hue, contrast of temperature, contrast of saturation, simultaneous contrast, contrast of sizes, and contrast of complementary. These seven kinds of colour contrasts have inspired past works involving colour schemes in design.

Colour schemes

Colour schemes are defined as the set of colours chosen for a design. They are often made up of two or more colours that look appealing beside one another, and that create an aesthetic feeling when used together. Colour schemes depend on colour harmony as they point to which colours look pleasing beside one another.

A satisfactory design product is often accompanied by a successful colour scheme. Over time, colour design tools with the function of generating colour schemes were developed to facilitate colour harmonizing for designers.

Use of colour in visual design 

 Colour is used to create harmony, balance, and visual comfort in a design
 Colour is used to evoke the desired mood and emotion upon the viewer
 Colour is used to create a theme in the design
 Colour holds meaning and can be symbolic. In certain cultures, different colours can have different meanings.
 Colour is used to put emphasis on desired elements and create visual hierarchy in a piece of art
 Colour can create identity for a certain brand or design product
Colour allows viewers to have different interpretations of visual designs. The same colour can evoke different emotions, or have various meanings to different individuals and cultures
Colour strategies are used for organization and consistency in a design product
In the architectural design of a retail environment, colours affect decision making which motivates consumers to buy particular products

Line
The line is an element of art defined by a point moving in space. Lines can be vertical, horizontal, diagonal, or curved. They can be any width or texture, and can be continuous, implied, or broken. On top of that, there are different types of lines aside from the ones previously mentioned. For example, you could have a line that is horizontal and zigzagged or a line that is vertical and zigzagged. Different lines create different moods, it all depends on what mood you are using line to create.

Point 
A point is basically the beginning of “something” in “nothing”. It forces the mind to think upon its position and gives something to build upon in both imagination and space. Some abstract points in a group can provoke human imagination to link it with familiar shapes or forms.

Shape

A shape is defined as a two dimensional area that stands out from the space next to or around it due to a defined or implied boundary, or because of differences of value, color, or texture. Shapes are recognizable objects and forms and are usually composed of other elements of design.

For example, a square that is drawn on a piece of paper is considered a shape. It is created with a series of lines which serve as a boundary that shapes the square and separates it from the space around it that is not part of the square.

Types of shapes
Geometric shapes or mechanical shapes are shapes that can be drawn using a ruler or compass, such as squares, circles, triangles, ellipses, parallelograms, stars, and so on. Mechanical shapes, whether simple or complex, produce a feeling of control and order.

Organic shapes are irregular shapes that are often complex and resemble shapes that are found in nature. Organic shapes can be drawn by hand, which is why they are sometimes subjective and only exist in the imagination of the artist.

Curvilinear shapes are composed of curved lines and smooth edges. They give off a more natural feeling to the shape. In contrast, rectilinear shapes are composed of sharp edges and right angles, and give off a sense of order in the composition. They look more human-made, structured, and artificial. Artists can choose to create a composition that revolves mainly around one of these styles of shape, or they can choose to combine both.

Texture

Texture refers to the physical and visual qualities of a surface.

Uses of texture in design 

 Texture can be used to attract or repel interest to an element, depending on how pleasant the texture is perceived to be. 
 Texture can also be used to add complex detail into the composition of a design. 
 In theatrical design, the surface qualities of a costume sculpts the look and feel of a character, which influences the way the audience reacts to the character.

Types of texture

Tactile texture, also known as "actual texture", refers to the physical three-dimensional texture of an object. Tactile texture can be perceived by the sense of touch. A person can feel the tactile texture of a sculpture by running their hand over its surface and feelings its ridges and dents.

 Painters use impasto to build peaks and create texture in their painting.
 Texture can be created through collage. This is when artists assemble three dimensional objects and apply them onto a two-dimensional surface, like a piece of paper or canvas, to create one final composition.
 Papier collé is another collaging technique in which artists glue paper to a surface to create different textures on its surface.
 Assemblage is a technique that consists of assembling various three-dimensional objects into a sculpture, which can also reveal textures to the viewer.

Visual texture, also referred to as "implied texture", is not detectable by our sense of touch, but by our sense of sight. Visual texture is the illusion of a real texture on a two-dimensional surface. Any texture perceived in an image or photograph is a visual texture. A photograph of rough tree bark is considered a visual texture. It creates the impression of a real texture on a two-dimensional surface which would remain smooth to the touch no matter how rough the represented texture is.

In painting, different paints are used to achieve different types of textures. Paints such as oil, acrylic, and encaustic are thicker and more opaque and are used to create three-dimensional impressions on the surface. Other paints, such as watercolor, tend to be used for visual textures, because they are thinner and have transparency, and do not leave much tactile texture on the surface.

Pattern 
Many textures appear to repeat the same motif. When a motif is repeated over and over again in a surface, it results in a pattern. Patterns are frequently used in fashion design or textile design, where motifs are repeated to create decorative patterns on fabric or other textile materials. Patterns are also used in architectural design, where decorative structural elements such as windows, columns, or pediments, are incorporated into building design.

Space
In design, space is concerned with the area deep within the moment of designated design, the design will take place on. For a two-dimensional design, space concerns creating the illusion of a third dimension on a flat surface:

Overlap is the effect where objects appear to be on top of each other. This illusion makes the top element look closer to the observer. There is no way to determine the depth of the space, only the order of closeness.
Shading adds gradiation marks to make an object of a two-dimensional surface seem three-dimensional.
Highlight, Transitional Light, Core of the Shadow, Reflected Light, and Cast Shadow give an object a three-dimensional look.
Linear Perspective is the concept relating to how an object seems smaller the farther away it gets.
Atmospheric Perspective is based on how air acts as a filter to change the appearance of distant objects.

Form
In visual design, form is described as the way an artist arranges elements in the entirety of a composition. It may also be described as any three-dimensional object. Form can be measured, from top to bottom (height), side to side (width), and from back to front (depth). Form is also defined by light and dark. It can be defined by the presence of shadows on surfaces or faces of an object. There are two types of form, geometric (artificial) and natural (organic form). Form may be created by the combining of two or more shapes. It may be enhanced by tone, texture or color. It can be illustrated or constructed.

Principles of the design of the art

Principles applied to the elements of design that bring them together into one design. How one applies these principles determines how successful a design may be.

Unity/harmony
According to Alex White, author of The Elements of Graphic Design, to achieve visual unity is a main goal of graphic design. When all elements are in agreement, a design is considered unified. No individual part is viewed as more important than the whole design. A good balance between unity and variety must be established to avoid a chaotic or a lifeless design.

Methods
Perspective: sense of distance between elements.
Similarity: ability to seem repeatable with other elements.
Continuation: the sense of having a line or pattern extend.
Repetition: elements being copied or mimicked numerous times.
Rhythm: is achieved when recurring position, size, color, and use of a graphic element has a focal point interruption.
Altering the basic theme achieves unity and helps keep interest.

Balance
It is a state of equalized tension and equilibrium, which may not always be calm.

Types of balance in visual design

 Symmetry
Asymmetrical balance produces an informal balance that is attention attracting and dynamic.
 Radial balance is arranged around a central element. The elements placed in a radial balance seem to 'radiate' out from a central point in a circular fashion.
 Overall is a mosaic form of balance which normally arises from too many elements being put on a page. Due to the lack of hierarchy and contrast, this form of balance can look noisy but sometimes quiet.

Hierarchy/Dominance/Emphasis

A good design contains elements that lead the reader through each element in order of its significance. The type and images should be expressed starting from most important to the least important. Dominance is created by contrasting size, positioning, color, style, or shape. The focal point should dominate the design with scale and contrast without sacrificing the unity of the whole.

Scale/proportion
Using the relative size of elements against each other can attract attention to a focal point. When elements are designed larger than life, the scale is being used to show drama.

Similarity and contrast
Planning a consistent and similar design is an important aspect of a designer's work to make their focal point visible. Too much similarity is boring but without similarity important elements will not exist and an image without contrast is uneventful so the key is to find the balance between similarity and contrast.

Similar environment
There are several ways to develop a similar environment:
Build a unique internal organization structure.
Manipulate shapes of images and text to correlate together.
Express continuity from page to page in publications. Items to watch include headers, themes, borders, and spaces.
Develop a style manual and adhere to it.

Contrasts
Space
Filled / Empty
Near / Far
2-D / 3-D
Position
Left / Right
Isolated / Grouped
Centered / Off-Center
Top / Bottom
Form
Simple / Complex
Beauty / Ugly
Whole / Broken
Direction
Stability / Movement
Structure
Organized / Chaotic
Mechanical / Hand-Drawn
Size
Large / Small
Deep / Shallow
Fat / Thin
Color
Grey scale / Color
Black & White / Color
Light / Dark
Texture
Fine / Coarse
Smooth / Rough
Sharp / Dull
Density
Transparent / Opaque
Thick / Thin
Liquid / Solid
Gravity
Light / Heavy
Stable / Unstable

Movement is the path the viewer’s eye takes through the artwork, often to focal areas. Such movement can be directed along lines edges, shape and color within the artwork, and more.

See also
 Composition (visual arts)
 Interior design
 Landscape design
 Pattern language
 Elements of art
 Principles of art
 Color theory

Notes

References
Kilmer, R., & Kilmer, W. O. (1992). Designing Interiors. Orland, FL: Holt, Rinehart and Winston, Inc. .
Nielson, K. J., & Taylor, D. A. (2002). Interiors: An Introduction. New York: McGraw-Hill Companies, Inc.  
Pile, J.F. (1995; fourth edition, 2007). Interior Design. New York: Harry N. Abrams, Inc.  
Sully, Anthony (2012). Interior Design: Theory and Process. London: Bloomsbury. .

External links

Art, Design, and Visual Thinking. An online, interactive textbook by Charlotte Jirousek at Cornell University.
The 6 Principles of Design
The Principles and Laws of UX Design – Why Every Designer Should Know Them 

Design